The Billboard Hot Latin Songs and Latin Airplay are charts that rank the best-performing Latin songs in the United States and are both published weekly by Billboard magazine. The Hot Latin Songs chart ranks the best-performing Spanish-language songs in the country based on digital downloads, streaming, and airplay from all radio stations. The Latin Airplay chart ranks the most-played songs on Spanish-language radio stations in the United States regardless of genre or language.

Chart history

Hot Latin Songs weeks at number one

Songs

Artists

See also
2021 in Latin music
List of artists who reached number one on the U.S. Latin Songs chart
List of number-one Billboard Latin Albums from the 2020s

References

External links
Current Hot Latin chart
Current Latin Airplay chart

United States Latin Songs
2021
2021 in Latin music